John Gidman (born 10 January 1954) is an English former footballer who played for Aston Villa, Everton, Manchester United, Manchester City, Stoke City and Darlington. Gidman was a product of the Liverpool and Aston Villa academies.

Career
Gidman played for the Liverpool youth team without ever playing for their first team, before he joined Aston Villa in 1971, playing in his first season in their youth side that won the 1972 FA Youth Cup, beating his former side Liverpool in the final. He was later a member of the 1977 League Cup winning side. In August 1979 Gidman demanded better terms, despite two years remaining on his existing contract; Ron Saunders agreed that he could leave the club. He was subsequently signed by Everton for £650,000 in a deal which saw midfielder Pat Heard move the other way at a valuation of £100,000.

Gidman then became Manchester United's new manager Ron Atkinson's first signing as he moved to United in 1981 as part of a £450,000 swap deal, with Mickey Thomas moving to Everton. He helped United win the FA Cup in 1985. After scoring 4 goals in 120 appearances for United (including 4 substitute appearances), he left the club for rivals Manchester City in 1986. During his two seasons at City, the club was relegated to the Second Division. He then moved to Stoke City and Darlington, and retired after seeing his final club relegated to the Football Conference in 1989.

Gidman made his solitary appearance for England in March 1977 against Luxembourg.

Career statistics
Source:

A.  The "Other" column constitutes appearances and goals in the FA Charity Shield, Full Members Cup, Screen Sport Super Cup, UEFA Cup and UEFA Cup Winners' Cup.

International
Source:

References

External links
 Profile at football-england.com
 John Gidman visits Obelisk

1954 births
Living people
Association football defenders
English footballers
England under-23 international footballers
England international footballers
England B international footballers
Liverpool F.C. players
Aston Villa F.C. players
Everton F.C. players
Manchester United F.C. players
Manchester City F.C. players
Stoke City F.C. players
Darlington F.C. players
Footballers from Liverpool
English Football League players
FA Cup Final players